Caroline Chew may refer to:
 King Lan Chew, or Caroline Chew, American dancer
 Caroline Chew (equestrian), Singaporean equestrian and solicitor